is a Japanese actor. His career has centered on television tokusatsu and jidaigeki. He starred in the 1967–68 television series Kōsoku Esper and the 1973 series Shirojishi Kamen, and played a supporting role as the ninja Saizō in Series III, Episodes 1–57, of Abarenbō Shōgun. In NHK's eleventh Taiga drama, Kunitori Monogatari, Mitsugi portrayed Akechi Mitsuharu. He appeared regularly in Episodes 436–509 of Tokusō Saizensen.  A frequent guest actor, he made six appearances on Ōedo Sōsamō and four on Zenigata Heiji, three on Taiyō ni Hoero!', and two on Happyaku Yachō Yume Nikki. Fans of the tokusatsu Chikyuu Sentai Fiveman know him as Dr. Hoshikawa. The producers of Abarenbō Shōgun selected him to reprise his role in the 500th episode special, and again to portray the daimyō Tokugawa Munenao in Series VI.

Outside drama series, his career includes other media and genres. In film, Mitsugi has three credits. He was a guest voice in an episode of the animated 1979 television show Takarajima. He has acted in stage productions in the 1970s, 1980s, and 1990s. A vocalist, Mitsugi has released nine single recordings and one album.

References

Sources
This article incorporates material translated from 三ツ木清隆 (Mitsugi Kiyotaka) in the Japanese Wikipedia, retrieved on January 30, 2009.

External links
Official site

Japanese male actors
1953 births
Living people